Avital is a moshav in northern Israel. Located ten kilometers south of Afula, it falls under the jurisdiction of Gilboa Regional Council.

History
The village was founded in 1953 by immigrants from Iran, Turkey and Kurdistan as part of the Moshavim Movement. 

Avital is located on land that until 1933 belonged to the Palestinian village of Zir'in. 

The name is connected to King David, Avital was one of his wives (2 Samuel 3:4). But tal (eng. dew) reminds also of David's lament in this area: "O mountains of Gilboa, may You have no dew" (2 Samuel 1:21).

See also
Ta'anakh district

References

Iranian-Jewish culture in Israel
Kurdish-Jewish culture in Israel
Moshavim
Populated places in Northern District (Israel)
Turkish-Jewish culture in Israel
1953 establishments in Israel
Populated places established in 1953